Mountain Justice is a 1930 American pre-Code 
Western film directed by Harry Joe Brown and written by Bennett Cohen and Leslie Mason. The film stars Ken Maynard, Otis Harlan, Kathryn Crawford, Paul Hurst, Les Bates and Richard Carlyle. The film was released on May 4, 1930, by Universal Pictures.

Cast 
Ken Maynard as Ken McTavish
Otis Harlan as Jud McTavish
Kathryn Crawford as Coral Harland
Paul Hurst as Lem Harland
Les Bates as Abner Harland
Richard Carlyle as Judge Keats
Gilbert Holmes as Rusty
Len Nash as Band Leader

References

External links 
 

1930 films
1930s English-language films
American Western (genre) films
1930 Western (genre) films
Universal Pictures films
Films directed by Harry Joe Brown
American black-and-white films
1930s American films